The 1902 Pennsylvania gubernatorial election occurred on November 4, 1902. Republican candidate Samuel W. Pennypacker defeated Democratic candidate and former Governor Robert E. Pattison to become Governor of Pennsylvania. James Kerr and George W. Guthrie unsuccessfully sought the Democratic nomination.

Results

References

1902
Pennsylvania
Gubernatorial
November 1902 events